Good humor or good humour, may refer to:

 Good Humor, a U.S. brand of ice cream
 Good Humor Bar, an ice cream bar that originated the ice cream brand Good Humor
 Good Humor-Breyers, a U.S. food corporation that makes the "Good Humor" ice cream brand
 Good Humor (album), a 1998 album by Saint-Etienne
 Good Humour, a 1991 album by Stephen Cummings
 Good Humor (Hot Stylz album)
 Good Humor Party, a global satirical organization founded in Poland, with some political party affiliates

See also

 The Good-Humoured Ladies, a ballet
 The Good Humor Man (disambiguation)